Ahmed Nuhu Bamalli CFR (born 8 June 1966) is a Nigerian lawyer, banker and diplomat. He is the former Nigerian ambassador to Thailand with concurrent accreditation to Myanmar, and the current 19th Fulani Emir of Zazzau, a Nigerian traditional state with headquarters in Zaria, Kaduna State, Nigeria. He is the first Emir from the Mallawa ruling house to be enthroned in a century after the demise of his grandfather, Emir Alu Dan Sidi in 1920.

Early life and education 
Bamalli was born in Kwarbai Zaria city, Kaduna State, Nigeria. He is the first son of Nuhu Bamalli (who once served as Nigeria's Minister of Foreign Affairs). He obtained a post graduate diploma in management from the Enugu State University of Science and Technology in 1998. He also attended a fellowship on conflict resolution at the University of York in 2009 and completed a diploma in organizational leadership from the University of Oxford in 2015. He also completed the General Management Program (GMP) at Harvard Business School in 2011.

Career 
Bamalli worked for the Metropolitan Management Agency before becoming head of human resources at Mtel, the mobile communication arm of the old Nigerian Telecommunications Limited.

He also worked in banking and as executive director and later acting managing director of the Nigerian Security Printing and Minting Company Limited.

He was permanent commissioner in the Kaduna State Independent Electoral Commission in 2015. Until his appointment as the new emir of Zazzau, Bamalli held the title of Magajin Garin Zazzau and served as Nigeria's Ambassador to Thailand, with concurrent accreditation to Myanmar.

Emir of Zazzau 
He was appointed as the new Emir of Zazzau by Nasir el-Rufai, Governor of Kaduna State on 7 October 2020. He is the first son of Nuhu Bamalli (Magajin Garin Zazzau).

Bamalli is the first emir from Mallawa ruling house in 100 years, following the demise of Alh Shehu Idris.

Awards 
In October 2022, a Nigerian national honor of Commander Of The Order Of The Fedral Republic (CFR) was conferred on him by President Muhammadu Buhari.

References

1966 births
Ahmadu Bello University alumni
Emirs of Zazzau
People from Zaria
Nigerian traditional rulers
Living people
Ambassadors of Nigeria to Thailand
Ambassadors of Nigeria to Myanmar
Hausa people